Wolfgang Girardi (19 April 1928 – 28 March 2018) was an Austrian gymnast. He competed in eight events at the 1952 Summer Olympics.

References

1928 births
2018 deaths
Austrian male artistic gymnasts
Olympic gymnasts of Austria
Gymnasts at the 1952 Summer Olympics
Place of birth missing